Kaba proper is a Bongo–Bagirmi language of Chad and the Central African Republic. It is one of several local languages that go by the names Kaba and Sara.  There are three ISO codes, which Ethnologue acknowledges may be the same thing.

References

External links
 A children's video in Sara Kaba Na

Bongo–Bagirmi languages
Languages of Chad
Languages of the Central African Republic